Hana Academy Seoul (also known as Hana High School, Hangeul: 하나고) is a private high school located in Seoul, South Korea. HAS was established in 2010 by Hana Financial Group, one of the largest financial groups in South Korea. Generally, the purpose of the most high schools in South Korea is to prepare students for the CSAT, but HAS has a unique curriculum. For this reason, HAS is often called for "Korea's Eton College" All HAS students must live in the school dormitory.

References

External links
  

2010 establishments in South Korea
Educational institutions established in 2010
High schools in South Korea
High schools in Seoul
Boarding schools in South Korea